Markaz Law College, is a centre of higher legal education in Kozhikode, India. The law college is the first project launched under the Knowledge City of Markazu Saquafathi Sunniyya, the college is affiliated to the University of Calicut and is recognised by the Bar Council of India. It offers integrated five-year course BBA with Bachelor of Laws and three-year course LLB.

See also 
 List of educational institutions in Kozhikode district

References

External links
 

Markaz
Islamic universities and colleges in India
Law schools in Kerala
Colleges affiliated with the University of Calicut
Universities and colleges in Kozhikode
Educational institutions established in 2015
2015 establishments in Kerala